Paris Basket Racing, or PBR, was a French professional basketball club from Paris. It was founded in 1922, as the basketball section of the multi-sports club Racing Club de Paris. The team took the name "Paris Basket Racing" in 2000. In 2007, the club merged with another club from the Paris area, Levallois Sporting Club Basket, to form the current version of the club, known first as Paris-Levallois Basket, and later as Levallois Metropolitans and Metropolitans 92.

History
Paris Basket Racing won three French national championships in the 1950s, in the 1950–51, 1952–53, and 1953–54 seasons, then won a French Pro A title in the 1996–97 season.

In 2007, the club merged with another club from the Paris area, Levallois Sporting Club Basket, to form the club's newest incarnation,
Paris-Levallois Basket. After the merger, Paris-Levallois Basket retained all of the history of both Paris Basket Racing and Levallois Sporting Club Basket. Paris-Levallois Basket was then renamed Levallois Metropolitans in 2017, and Metropolitans 92 in 2019.

Names of the club
Racing Club France Basket (RC France Basket): (1922–1989)
Racing Paris Basket: (1989–1992)
Paris Saint Germain Racing Basket (PSG Racing Basket): (1992–2000)
Paris Basket Racing: (2000–2007)

Arenas
Paris Basket Racing played its home games at the 4,000 seat Palais des sports Marcel-Cerdan, and at the 4,200 seat Stade Pierre de Coubertin.

Titles and honors

Domestic competitions
French League
Champions (4): 1951, 1953, 1954, 1997
Runners-up (1): 1956
French Federation Cup 
Runners-up (3): 1956, 1993, 2000
French Second Division
Champions (4): 1936, 1954, 1977, 1985

Season by season

Players

Notable players

France:
  Arsène Ade-Mensah
  Yann Bonato
  Robert Busnel
  Richard Dacoury
  Mamoutou Diarra
  Hervé Dubuisson
  Frédéric Forte
  Jacques Freimuller
  Thierry Gadou
  Philippe Hervé
  Freddy Hufnagel
  Cyril Julian
  Éric Micoud
  Jacques Monclar
  Robert Monclar
  Franck Mériguet
  T. J. Parker
  Tony Parker
  Jean Perniceni
  Stéphane Risacher
  Thierry Rupert
  Victor Samnick
  Jean-Marc Sétier
  Laurent Sciarra
  Stephane Bouchardon

USA:
  CC Harrison
  John Linehan
  Jerrod Mustaf
  J. R. Reid
  Sedale Threatt

Europe:
 - Nedeljko Ašćerić
  Yalçın Granit
  Dragan Kićanović
  Dejan Koturović
  Nikola Lončar
 -  François Németh
  Žarko Paspalj
  Oleksiy Pecherov
  Alfonso Reyes
  Eric Struelens
  Mirsad Türkcan
  Jure Zdovc

Asia:
 - J. R. Sakuragi

Erez Markovich (born 1978), Israeli basketball player

Head coaches

 Robert Busnel: (1949–1952)
 Jean Perniceni: (1952–1954) 
 Robert Monclar: (1954–1959, 1965–1966) 
 Jacques Freimuller: (1959–1961) 
 Laurent Franchescini: (1961–1963, 1967–1968) 
 Edmond Gondal: (1969–1971) 
 Antoine Schneider &  Jacques Pocquet: (1971–1972) 
 Gérard de Félices: (1973–1974) 
 Gérard Mullon &  Marko Ostarčević: (1977–1978) 
 Dominique Richard Laurent Dorigo: (1985–1986) 
 George Eddy &  André Buffière: (1986–1987) 
 Jean-Michel Sénégal: (1987–1989) 
 Laurent Dorigo: (1989) 
 George Fischer &  Grég Beugnot &  Laurent Bosc: (1989–1990) 
 Grég Beugnot: (1989–92)
 Chris Singleton: (1993–97)
 Jacky Renaud &  Didier Dobbels: (1997)
 Božidar Maljković: (1997–98)
 Erik Lehmann: (2001–02)
 Jacques Monclar: (2002–05)
 Gordon Herbert: (2005–06)
 Ilias Zouros: (2006–07)

See also
Levallois Sporting Club Basket
Metropolitans 92

External links
Paris Basket Racing's Club History 

Basketball
Basketball teams established in 1922
Basketball teams disestablished in 2007
Basketball teams in Paris
Defunct basketball teams in France
Sport in Hauts-de-Seine